The Georgetown Hoyas men's soccer team represents Georgetown University in all men's Division I NCAA soccer competitions. The Georgetown Hoyas joined the new Big East Conference on July 1, 2013, with other private schools from the former Big East Conference in which they previously competed. They won a national championship in 2019, and was the national runner-up in 2012. They have made nine total appearances in the NCAA Men's Division I Soccer Championship, and have won the Big East conference tournament four times and the regular season title seven times.

Current roster

Stadium 

Shaw Field is home of Georgetown men's and women's soccer. The teams began practice on the field in 1996, but did not play their first game until the 2001 fall season. The field surface is natural Bermuda grass, and the facility possesses a seating capacity of 1,625. The complex is located above Yates Field House between Kehoe Field and the Georgetown Medical School. Georgetown holds a record of 97-33-15 (as of 2015) at Shaw Field.

Seasons

1994 season 
In 1994, the Hoyas achieved an 18–4 record and the school's first-ever berth in the NCAA Championship as well as its first Big East regular season title. Keith Tabatznik was named the South Atlantic Region and Big East Coach of the Year.

1997 season 
GU captured its first-ever NCAA Tournament victory with a 2–1 triumph over Virginia Commonwealth on November 23. The Hoyas finished 1997 with a 15–7 overall record and were second in the competitive Big East Conference with a 9–2 mark.

2012 season 
Georgetown broke onto the national stage in 2012, the most successful season to date in program history.  The Hoyas went 19-4-3 with a mark of 6-2-0 in the Big East Conference.  The squad was the third overall seed in the NCAA Tournament and the 19 wins were the most in program history.  The Hoyas were the Big East Blue Division Champions, the Big East Championship runners-up and advanced to the national championship game in penalty kicks in a game against the University of Maryland.  The Hoyas were runners-up to Indiana in the 2012 NCAA Division I Men's Soccer Championship.  Brian Wiese was selected as National Coach of the Year.

2015 season 
After opening the season 0-2-1, Georgetown went on a program record 18-game unbeaten streak including a 14-game win streak. Along the way, the Hoyas won the Big East Regular Season title with a perfect 9-0-0 record. It was the fifth time in program history that the Hoyas have won the regular season championship.  Georgetown also won the Big East Championship crown by beating Creighton, marking the first time in program history that the Hoyas won the league's postseason tournament.

Head Coach history

Notable alumni

See also

 Sports in Washington, D.C.

References

External links